Pigritia gruis is a moth in the family Blastobasidae. It is found in Costa Rica.

The length of the forewings is about 4.6 mm. The forewings are pale brown, intermixed with white scales and a few brown scales. The hindwings are translucent pale brown, gradually darkening towards the apex.

Etymology
The specific name is derived from Latin grus (meaning a crane).

References

Moths described in 2013
Blastobasidae